Jean Dickenson (born ) is an American former singer.

Early life 
Born in Montreal, Dickenson was the daughter of mining engineer Ernest Heathcote Dickenson and novelist May Dickenson. Her father's work took him to several countries, with the family living in the Philippines, India, Europe, and South Africa before settling in Denver, Colorado, when Dickenson was 14 years old. There she began taking singing lessons after having previously studied piano. She graduated from the Lamont School of Music after gaining her primary education in New York City and her secondary education in San Francisco.

While Dickenson was a student at Lamont, she won a national singing contest from a group of 200 sopranos.

Career 
During her final year at Lamont, Dickenson was featured on the NBC radio program Golden Melodies, which originated at KOA in Denver. After that, she sang on Hollywood Hotel and The American Album of Familiar Music.

A protege of Lily Pons, Dickenson sang with symphonies in Denver and Milwaukee, the Little Symphony in Montreal,  the Cincinnati Summer Opera, the San Carlo Opera Company, and with the Denver Grand Opera Company. On January 26, 1940, she made her Metropolitan Opera debut, portraying Philena in Mignon.

On radio, Dickenson sang on The American Album of Familiar Music for at least eight years.

References 
 

Year of birth missing
Year of death missing
20th-century American women singers
Metropolitan Opera people
20th-century American singers
American radio personalities